The National Basketball Association's Sixth Man of the Year Award is an annual National Basketball Association (NBA) award given since the 1982–83 NBA season to the league's best performing player for his team coming off the bench as a substitute (or sixth man). A panel of sportswriters and broadcasters from throughout the United States and Canada votes on the recipient. Starting with the 2022–23 NBA season, winners receive the John Havlicek Trophy, named after the eight-time NBA champion.

Each judge casts a vote for first, second and third place selections. Each first-place vote is worth five points; each second-place vote is worth three points; and each third-place vote is worth one point. The player with the highest point total, regardless of the number of first-place votes, wins the award. To be eligible for the award, a player must come off the bench in more games than he starts. The 2008–09 winner, Jason Terry, averaged the most playing time of any sixth man in an award-winning season; he finished the year with an average of 33.7 minutes played per game with the Dallas Mavericks.

Bobby Jones was the inaugural winner of the award for the 1982–83 NBA season. The 2021-22 recipient was Tyler Herro of the Miami Heat. Jamal Crawford and Lou Williams are the only three time winners of the award. Kevin McHale, Ricky Pierce and Detlef Schrempf won the award twice.  McHale, Toni Kukoč, Bobby Jones, Bill Walton, and Manu Ginóbili are the only Hall of Famers who have won the award; Walton, along with James Harden, are the only award winners to have earned NBA MVP honors in their careers. Manu Ginóbili is the only award winner to be named to an All-NBA team in the same season.

Manu Ginóbili, Detlef Schrempf, Leandro Barbosa, Toni Kukoč, and Ben Gordon are the only award winners not born in the United States. Gordon was the first player to win the award as a rookie. Of the five foreign-born winners, three were trained completely outside the U.S., namely Ginóbili, Barbosa and Kukoč. Schrempf played two years of high school basketball in Centralia, Washington before playing college basketball at Washington, and Gordon was raised in Mount Vernon, New York and went on to play in college at Connecticut.

Winners

Multi-time winners

Teams

See also

Notes

References
General

 
 

Specific

Sixth Man of the Year
National Basketball Association lists
Awards established in 1983